WYLV is a non-commercial, non-profit Contemporary Christian radio station broadcasting on 88.3 MHz in the Knoxville, Tennessee area.

WDLF began broadcasting a Contemporary Christian format as Life 88.3 on June 1, 2008. It had been a beautiful music station as WOEZ "EZ88" prior to the switch.

On January 1, 2011, WYLV became an affiliate of the Air 1 network after being sold to Educational Media Foundation. Later in January, the WYLV call letters were moved to the 88.3 frequency, as an affiliate of the K-LOVE network. At that time, Air 1 moved to WOFM (FM), which had been WYLV.

References

External links

Contemporary Christian radio stations in the United States
K-Love radio stations
YLV
Educational Media Foundation radio stations
Radio stations established in 1997
YLV